Thomas Woodrow Smith (born December 9, 1942) is a former American college baseball coach and catcher. He played professional baseball in 1962, before retiring due to injury. He was the head baseball coach at Michigan State University from 1983 to 1995.

Playing career
Smith attended Coldwater High School in Coldwater, Michigan, where he played baseball, basketball and football. On August 17, 1961, it was reported that Smith had signed a professional baseball contract with the Milwaukee Braves. Smith began his professional career with the Dublin Braves of the Georgia–Florida League, where he hit .243 with 3 home runs and 35 RBIs. Following an injury plagued 1963 season, Smith turned down a contract from the Los Angeles Angels and retired from professional baseball.

Coaching career
Smith worked as a student assistant under Danny Litwhiler until he completed his degree. In 1967, he worked as the freshman coach as well as an assistant with the varsity. On March 12, 1982, Smith was promoted to head coach after Litwhiler announced his retirement.

Head coaching record

References

External links

1942 births
Living people
Dublin Braves players
Michigan State Spartans baseball coaches
People from Coldwater, Michigan